Michael Haydn's Symphony No. 15 in D major, Perger 41, Sherman 15, MH 150, is believed to have been written in Salzburg after 1771. This work was at one time attributed to Joseph Haydn, the first work in D major so attributed.

Scored for flute, 2 oboes, 2 bassoons, 2 horns and strings, in four movements:

Allegro spiritoso
Minuet and Trio (in A major)
Andante (in G major)
Presto assai

The placement of the Minuet second, before the slow movement, is unusual in Michael Haydn's symphonies, though there is one other specimen, the Symphony No. 16, which scholars are fairly certain is a close contemporary to this one. Three symphonies by brother Joseph Haydn also have this placement, 32, 37 and 44.

The corresponding placement of the Scherzo second in the Romantic era, despite Ludwig van Beethoven's Ninth Symphony, remained rare until Anton Bruckner's Second (original version), Eighth and Ninth symphonies, and Gustav Mahler's First, Fourth and Sixth (original version) symphonies.

Discography

Included in a set of 20 symphonies on the CPO label with Bohdan Warchal conducting the Slovak Philharmonic. Also available on a Hungaroton CD of the Capella Savaria conducted by Pál Németh.

References
 A. Delarte, "A Quick Overview Of The Instrumental Music Of Michael Haydn" Bob's Poetry Magazine November 2006: 34 PDF
 Charles H. Sherman and T. Donley Thomas, Johann Michael Haydn (1737 - 1806), a chronological thematic catalogue of his works. Stuyvesant, New York: Pendragon Press (1993)
 C. Sherman, "Johann Michael Haydn" in The Symphony: Salzburg, Part 2 London: Garland Publishing (1982): lxv

Symphony 15
Compositions in D major